"Barely Breathing" is a song by American singer-songwriter Duncan Sheik from his eponymous debut studio album (1996). It was released as the lead single from the album on May 3, 1996, by Atlantic Records, having been released to radio in May 1996. Sheik is the sole writer of the song, while production was helmed by Rupert Hine. The song became a chart hit in North America in early 1997, receiving several accolades in the years following its release.

Critical reception
Larry Flick of Billboard magazine called the song's hook "breezy and memorable" and its lyrics "intelligent".

Chart performance
"Barely Breathing" was Sheik's breakout hit, peaking at number 16 on the US Billboard Hot 100 and remaining on the chart for 55 weeks. At the time, it was the fourth-longest-running single on the Hot 100. It also reached number one on the Billboard Adult Alternative Songs chart and number 19 on the Billboard Hot Adult Contemporary chart. In Canada, the song peaked at number 12 on the RPM Top Singles chart and number 20 on the RPM Adult Contemporary chart. "Barely Breathing" also found moderate success in Iceland, peaking at number 40 on the Íslenski Listinn Topp 40.

Accolades
"Barely Breathing" was ranked number 88 on VH1's 100 Greatest Songs of the '90s. and number eight on their 40 Greatest One-Hit Wonders of the 90s list. Additionally, "Barely Breathing" earned Sheik a Grammy nomination for Best Male Pop Vocal Performance and a BMI Award for Most Played Song of the Year in 1997.

Music video
The music video was directed by Tom Oliphant in Brooklyn, New York, in the Brooklyn Navy Yard.

Track listings and formats
US CD single and cassette
 "Barely Breathing" – 4:15
 "Home" – 4:48

European CD single
 "Barely Breathing" (radio edit) – 3:57
 "The End of Outside" (live) – 5:02
 "Rubbed Out" (live) – 5:19

Credits and personnel
Credits and personnel are adapted from the Duncan Sheik album liner notes.
 Duncan Sheik – lead vocals, harmony vocals, acoustic guitar, electric guitar, E-Bow, piano, sampler
 Pino Palladino – bass
 Jean-Michel Biger – drums
 Rupert Hine – percussion, background vocals
 Fran Banish – slide guitar

Charts

Weekly charts

Year-end charts

All-time charts

Release history

Cover versions
"Barely Breathing" was one of the songs covered by the cast of Glee during the October 12, 2012, episode "The Break Up".

References

External links
 Official music video on YouTube

1996 debut singles
1996 songs
American pop rock songs
Atlantic Records singles
Duncan Sheik songs
Song recordings produced by Rupert Hine
Songs written by Duncan Sheik